Protein SMG5 is a protein that in humans is encoded by the SMG5 gene. This protein contains a PIN domain that appears to have mutated the residues in the active site.

References

Further reading